Richard W. Littlefield (September 17, 1948 – April 27, 2012) was an American politician. He served as a Democratic member for the 6th district of the Georgia State Senate.

Life and career 
Littlefield was born in Duval County, Florida. He attended Emory University and the University of Georgia.

Littlefield was an assistant district attorney for the Brunswick Judicial Circuit. In 1979, he was elected to represent the 6th district of the Georgia State Senate, succeeding Roscoe E. Dean. He served until 1982.

Littlefield died in April 2012 of heart failure, at the age of 63.

References 

People from Duval County, Florida
Democratic Party Georgia (U.S. state) state senators
20th-century American politicians
Emory University alumni
University of Georgia alumni

1948 births
2012 deaths